Jônatas Paulino da Silva Inácio (born 18 December 1985), known as Jônatas Obina, is a footballer who plays as a forward for Patrocinense. He earned his nickname after physical comparisons with fellow footballer Obina.

Born and raised in Brazil, he has been a member, as a naturalized citizen, of the Equatorial Guinea national team.

Club career
Jônatas Obina started his career at Democrata de Sete Lagoas, where he was discouraged to pursue professional football. After competing in the Copa São Paulo de Futebol Júnior for Vila Nova in January 2006, Jônatas Obina became a professional footballer and played mostly for Minas Gerais based clubs, being Campeonato Mineiro Módulo II's top goalscorer with 13 goals in his first stint with América-TO, thus earning him a move to Le Mans where he played with the reserve team for less than a year.

On his return to América-TO, Jônatas Obina was América's top goalscorer in the 2011 Campeonato Mineiro with 10 goals. Immediately after, he was signed by Clube Atlético Mineiro for 2011 Campeonato Brasileiro Série A. Jônatas made his debut as a second-half substitute in a 0–4 home loss against Internacional on 30 June 2011, scoring his first goal on his second appearance for the club on 10 July against América Mineiro, also scoring on his next match against Santos. He ended the year with 11 appearances for Galo, one of them during 2011 Copa Sudamericana.

The following year, after manager Cuca declared he was not part of the club plans, he was loaned to Ipatinga and later to Boa for 2012 Campeonato Brasileiro Série B.

International career
Jônatas Obina was naturalized Equatoguinean in 2012 and made his official debut in a 2014 FIFA World Cup qualifying match against Cape Verde coming off the bench in a 4–3 win. His second appearance was a lost friendly against Togo. On his next match, also against Cape Verde, he scored his first international goal in a 1–2 loss.

International goals
Scores and results list Equatorial Guinea's goal tally first.

Notes

References

External links
mg.superesportes.com.br
Jônatas Obina at playmakerstats.com (English version of ogol.com.br)

1985 births
Living people
Association football forwards
Equatoguinean footballers
Equatorial Guinea international footballers
Brazilian footballers
Sportspeople from Minas Gerais
Afro-Brazilian sportspeople
Campeonato Brasileiro Série A players
Clube Atlético Mineiro players
Campeonato Brasileiro Série B players
Boa Esporte Clube players
Campeonato Brasileiro Série C players
Associação Desportiva São Caetano players
Esporte Clube Juventude players
Campeonato Brasileiro Série D players
Mixto Esporte Clube players
Rio Branco Football Club players
Centro Sportivo Alagoano players
Fluminense de Feira Futebol Clube players
Naturalized citizens of Equatorial Guinea
Leones Vegetarianos FC players